Monaco competed at the 2022 Mediterranean Games held in Oran, Algeria from 25 June to 6 July 2022.

Albert II, Prince of Monaco attended judo competitions as a guest on 30 June.

Medalists

| width="78%" align="left" valign="top" |

Artistic gymnastics

Kevin Crovetto competed in the men's artistic individual all-around event.

Athletics

Monaco competed in athletics.

Boules

Monaco competed in boules.

Cycling

Monaco competed in cycling.

Equestrian

Monaco competed in equestrian.

Judo

Monaco competed in judo.

Men

Sailing

Monaco competed in sailing.

Swimming

Monaco competed in swimming.

Men

Women

Table tennis

Xiaoxin Yang won the gold medal in the women's singles event.

Tennis

Monaco competed in tennis.

Men

References

Nations at the 2022 Mediterranean Games
2022
Mediterranean Games